Erlingmark is a surname. Notable people with the surname include: 

August Erlingmark (born 1998), Swedish footballer
Magnus Erlingmark (born 1968), Swedish footballer, father of August